Melvin A. Steinberg (born October 4, 1933) is an American politician who served as the  fifth Lieutenant Governor of Maryland from 1987 to 1995  under Governor William Donald Schaefer. He was also President of the Maryland State Senate from January 1983 to 1987, and a member of the State Senate from 1967 until his election to the position of Lieutenant Governor.  Steinberg graduated from the University of Baltimore with an A.A. degree in 1952 and with a J.D. degree in 1955.

The relationship between Steinberg and Schaefer was strained, with each publicly criticising the other and extensive coverage being devoted to their personal relationship. Despite their differences, they worked together for eight years (1987–1995), winning two elections in the process. Steinberg ran for the Democratic gubernatorial nomination in 1994 launching his campaign pledging a war on crime, but was defeated by Parris Glendening, who went on to become governor. Steinberg then took up a career in lobbying. In 1998, he drew criticism for supporting the Republican candidate for Governor, Ellen Sauerbrey, rather than endorsing Glendening in his bid for re-election; Sauerbrey was a critic of abortion and of gun control, positions opposite those held by Steinberg. In 2018, he again endorsed the Republican nominee for governor, incumbent Larry Hogan, over the Democratic nominee, Ben Jealous.

References

1933 births
Lieutenant Governors of Maryland
Maryland state senators
United States Navy sailors
University of Baltimore alumni
Presidents of the Maryland State Senate
Living people
Baltimore City College alumni
University of Baltimore School of Law alumni